Sir George Burrard, 3rd Baronet  (6 April 1769 – 17 May 1856) was a Church of England priest.

He was the second son of William Burrard and nephew of Sir Harry Burrard, 1st Baronet, of Walhampton and succeeded his brother as baronet in 1840. He was Chaplain in Ordinary to Queen Victoria for 38 years.

References 

1769 births
1856 deaths
19th-century English Anglican priests
Honorary Chaplains to the Queen
Knights Grand Cross of the Order of St Michael and St George
Knights Grand Cross of the Order of the Bath
Baronets in the Baronetage of Great Britain